Dressed to Kill Tour may refer to:

 Dressed to Kill Tour (Cher), 2014
 Dressed to Kill Tour (Kiss), 1975